The 1991 Giro di Lombardia was the 85th edition of the Giro di Lombardia cycle race and was held on 19 October 1991. The race started and finished in Monza. The race was won by Sean Kelly of the PDM team.

General classification

References

1991
October 1991 sports events in Europe
1991 in road cycling
1991 in Italian sport
1991 UCI Road World Cup